Maheswaram is a village in Ranga Reddy district of the Indian state of Telangana. It is located in Maheswaram mandal of Kandukur revenue division.

References 

Villages in Ranga Reddy district